Peck Lake (French: lac Peck), a lake in the Canadian province of Saskatchewan, is located in the Bronson Forest Recreation Site in the Rural Municipality of Loon Lake No. 561,  east of the Alberta border. Access to the lake and its amenities is from Highway 21.

Geography 
Known for its bright turquoise-coloured water, unlike most other lakes in the region, Peck Lake is a popular spot for beachgoers, fishermen, and boaters.
Water flows southward across the lake, entering Peck Lake from Galletly Lake and exiting into the Monnery River. Monnery River is a tributary of the North Saskatchewan River. The south-eastern shore of the lake is subdivided into 50 lots, 45 of which have permanent structures.

Camping 
Peck Lake has one government-run campground, split into two sections: the beachfront campsites and the "overflow" forested campsites. Facilities include washrooms, a picnic shelter, fish-filleting table, sewage dump, and a swingset. The beachfront campground is situated directly next to the boat launch, providing easy access for launching watercraft. Each campsite has a picnic table, firepit, electrical plug, and free access to firewood.

Fish species 
Fish commonly found in Peck Lake include walleye and northern pike.

See also 
List of lakes of Saskatchewan

References

External links 

Lakes of Saskatchewan
Loon Lake No. 561, Saskatchewan